Hosanger is a former municipality in the old Hordaland county, Norway.  The municipality existed from 1838 until its dissolution in 1964.  The municipality was located in what is now parts of Alver Municipality and Osterøy Municipality in Vestland county. It originally covered all the lands on both sides of the Osterfjorden-Romarheimsfjorden from the Lonevågen fjord all the way east to the county border at the end of the Modalen valley.  Hosanger also included an exclave on the Lindås peninsula surrounding the village of Seim at the southern end of the Lurefjorden.  Seim was separated from the rest of Hosanger by part of Lindås Municipality. Over time, the areas of Seim and Modalen were split off from Hosanger.  The administrative centre of the municipality was the village of Hosanger on the island of Osterøy, where Hosanger Church is located.

History
The parish of Hosanger was established as a municipality on 1 January 1838 (see formannskapsdistrikt law). On 1 January 1885, the exclave of Seim was separated from Hosanger and merged into the new Alversund Municipality.  This left Hosanger with 3,387 residents.  On 1 January 1867, the Øksendalen farm (population: 28) in the Eksingedalen valley was transferred from Voss Municipality to Hosanger by Royal resolution. On 1 January 1910, the eastern part of Hosanger (population: 821) which included the Modalen and Eksingedalen valleys was separated from Hosanger to form the new Modalen Municipality. The split left Hosanger with 2,524 inhabitants.

During the 1960s, there were many municipal mergers across Norway due to the work of the Schei Committee. On 1 January 1964, the municipality of Hosanger was dissolved and its lands were divided as follows amongst its neighbors:
All of Hosanger located north of the Osterfjorden (population: 791) became a part of the enlarged Lindås Municipality.
All of Hosanger located on the island of Osterøy (population: 1,616) became a part of the new Osterøy Municipality.

Government

Municipal council
The municipal council  of Hosanger was made up of 17 representatives that were elected to four year terms.  The party breakdown of the final municipal council was as follows:

Hosanger Church

The historic Hosanger Church was built in 1796.  It is located in the village of Hosanger and it served as the main church for the municipality. It is a Romanesque-style church constructed of brick and stone. On the site there once was a stave church dating back to the Middle Ages.  It was first mentioned in historical records in 1329.  Later, a wooden church was constructed. The wooden church was struck by lightning and burned down on Christmas Day 1795. From 1863 until 1865, the church was extended to the west.  The vestry  extension on the south side of the church was built in 1962–1964.

Notable residents
Nicolai Wergeland, (1780-1848), priest and politician that wrote the Norwegian Constitution of May 1814
Arne Bjørndal (1882-1965), hardingfele fiddler, composer, and folklorist
Nils Andresson Lavik (1884-1966), politician from the Christian Democratic Party of Norway
Johannes Lavik (1856-1929), journalist and newspaper editor

See also
List of former municipalities of Norway

References

Alver (municipality)
Osterøy
Former municipalities of Norway
1838 establishments in Norway
1964 disestablishments in Norway